Yssouf Koné (born 19 February 1982) is a former professional footballer who played as a forward. Born in Ivory Coast, he represented Burkina Faso at international level.

Club career
Koné was born in Korhogo, Ivory Coast.

Rosenborg
Playing for Rosenborg, Koné scored ten goals in the UEFA Champions League 2007–08 season including qualification matches. In the 2006, 2007 and 2008 seasons he played in 44 Norwegian Premier League matches for Rosenborg, scoring 16 goals.

Cluj
Koné was transferred to CFR Cluj in the summer of 2008. He scored against Chelsea in the group-stage game of the UEFA Champions League 2008–2009, but the match eventually ended in a 2–1 loss for CFR Cluj. On 27 August 2009, he scored a goal in the ladder against FK Sarajevo in the Europa League qualifiers. The match ended 2–1 to CFR Cluj, who qualified in groups, it was the last goal for CFR in European Cups. Koné scored a total of 20 goals in all competitions for the CFR.

Vålerenga
In 2011 he played for the Norwegian team Vålerenga. On 29 January 2013, his contract with Vålerenga was terminated by mutual consent.

International career
Koné made the headlines by scoring two late goals to record a surprise away win for the Burkina Faso national team against Tunisia national team in the 2010 FIFA World Cup qualifiers.

Career statistics

Club

International
Scores and results list Burkina Faso's goal tally first, score column indicates score after each Koné goal.

Honours
Rosenborg
 Norwegian Premier League: 2006

Cluj
 Romanian First League: 2010
 Romanian Cup: 2009, 2010
 Romanian Supercup: 2009, 2010

References

1982 births
Living people
People from Korhogo
Association football forwards
Burkinabé footballers
Burkina Faso international footballers
Burkinabé expatriate footballers
2010 Africa Cup of Nations players
Eliteserien players
China League One players
Liga I players
Raja CA players
Olympic Club de Safi players
U.S. Lecce players
Rosenborg BK players
CFR Cluj players
Vålerenga Fotball players
Ivorian emigrants to Burkina Faso
Expatriate footballers in Norway
Expatriate footballers in China
Expatriate footballers in Romania
Expatriate footballers in Morocco
Ivorian expatriates in Norway
Burkinabé expatriate sportspeople in Norway
Ivorian expatriates in China
Burkinabé expatriate sportspeople in China
Ivorian expatriate sportspeople in Romania
Burkinabé expatriate sportspeople in Romania
21st-century Burkinabé people